The International Designator, also known as COSPAR ID, is an international identifier assigned to artificial objects in space. It consists of the launch year, a three-digit incrementing launch number of that year and up to a three-letter code representing the sequential identifier of a piece in a launch. In TLE format the first two digits of the year and the dash are dropped.

For example, 1990-037A is the Space Shuttle Discovery on mission STS-31, which carried the Hubble Space Telescope (1990-037B) into space. This launch was the 37th known successful launch worldwide in 1990.

The designation system has been generally known as the COSPAR system, named for the Committee on Space Research (COSPAR) of the International Council for Science.

COSPAR subsumed the first designation system, devised at Harvard University. That system used letters of the Greek alphabet to designate artificial satellites. This was based on the scientific naming convention for natural satellites. For example, Sputnik 1 was designated 1957 Alpha 2. The launch vehicle, which was brighter in orbit, was designated 1957 Alpha 1. Brighter objects in the same launch were given the lower integer number, and Alpha was given since it was the first launch of the year. The Harvard designation system continued to be used for satellites launched up to the end of 1962, when it was replaced with the modern system. The first satellite to receive a new-format designator was Luna E-6 No.2, 1963-001B, although some sources, including the NSSDC website, retroactively apply the new-format designators to older satellites, even those no longer in orbit at the time of its introduction.

Designators are assigned to objects by USSPACECOM along with  satellite catalog numbers as they are discovered in space. The United Nations Office for Outer Space Affairs (UNOOSA) and the National Space Science Data Center (NSSDC), part of NASA, maintain two catalogs that provide additional information on the launchers and payloads associated with the designators. While UNOOSA uses COSPAR ID, many NSSDC Master Catalog (NMC) entries are created before launches so they are not always bound to a COSPAR ID. Below are examples:

Spacecraft which do not complete an orbit of the Earth, for example launches which fail to achieve orbit, are not assigned IDs.

Satellites launched from the International Space Station are assigned a COSPAR ID beginning with "1998-067", because the (first module of the) space station was launched in 1998. For example, the satellite GOMX-3, launched on an H-II Transfer Vehicle on August 19, 2015, from Tanegashima Space Center in Japan, is designated COSPAR ID 1998-067HA, because it first arrived on the International Space Station from where it was later launched.

See also 
 Satellite Catalog Number

References

External links 
 Online Index of Objects Launched into Outer Space

 USSTRATCOM Space-Track
 CelesTrak (a partial copy of Space-Track.org catalog)
 Small Satellite Debris Catalog Maintenance Issues

Satellites
Identifiers